Else Lilly "Lilli" Andersen (later Svanberg, December 6, 1914 – January 24, 1988) was a Danish freestyle swimmer who competed in the 1932 Summer Olympics.

She was born in Sankt Jørgensbjerg, Roskilde and died in Oscar Parish, Stockholm, Married to Tage Svanberg, a Swedish swimmer and she was the mother to John Torp Larsson and Hans Svanberg.

In 1932 she was eliminated in the semi-finals of the 400 metre freestyle event. She also participated in the 100 metre freestyle competition but was eliminated in the first round. Hold the world record in 800 meter freestyle 1933. Still holds the swim record for female on the swim distance Barsebäck - Bellevue which was at the 6 August 1937. The recordtime was 7 hours and 47 minutes.

External links
profile

1914 births
1988 deaths
Olympic swimmers of Denmark
Swimmers at the 1932 Summer Olympics
European Aquatics Championships medalists in swimming
Danish female freestyle swimmers
People from Roskilde
Sportspeople from Region Zealand